George C. "Gil" Halstead (April 1, 1893 – June 1970) was an American college basketball standout at Cornell University in the 1910s. He was a Helms Athletic Foundation All-American in both 1913 and 1914, and was named their national player of the year after the 1913–14 season in which he helped the Big Red win back-to-back Eastern Intercollegiate League season championships.

References

1893 births
1970 deaths
All-American college men's basketball players
American men's basketball players
Basketball players from New York City
Centers (basketball)
Cornell Big Red men's basketball players
Sportspeople from Brooklyn